Zhupany ( or Жупа́нє) is a village (selo) in Stryi Raion, Lviv Oblast, of western Ukraine. It is located in the Ukrainian Carpathians, within limits of the Eastern Beskids on the border of the Zakarpattia Oblast. Zhupany belongs to Kozova rural hromada, one of the hromadas of Ukraine. The village has around 1277 inhabitants.i
Local government is administered by Zhupanivska village council.

Geography 
The village is located along the upper reaches of the Stryi River in between mountains, close to Verecke Pass.

History and attractions 
The first written mention of Zhupany dates back to the year 1515.
Zhupany was in 1867 visited by Ivan Franko and Osyp Makovei.

Until 18 July 2020, Nyzhnie Synovydne belonged to Skole Raion. The raion was abolished in July 2020 as part of the administrative reform of Ukraine, which reduced the number of raions of Lviv Oblast to seven. The area of Skole Raion was merged into Stryi Raion.

The village has an architectural monument of local importance of Stryi Raion, a wooden St. Michael the Archangel Church built in 1927 (2913-M).

References

External links 
 village Zhupany
 weather.in.ua
 Церква св. Архистратига Михаїла (с.Жупани, Львівська обл.): карта

Literature 
  Page 716

Villages in Stryi Raion